The 2007 Northwest Territories general election took place on October 1, 2007. Nineteen members were elected to the Legislative Assembly from single member districts conducted under first-past-the-post voting system.

The election was called on September 3, 2007, when the writ of returns was dropped by Chief Electoral Officer Saundra Arberry. This election was the first in Northwest Territories history to be conducted on a fixed election date calendar.

The territory operates on a consensus government system with no political parties; the premier is subsequently chosen by and from the Members of the Legislative Assembly (MLAs).

Election campaign
The final list of candidates was released on September 7, 2007. Three incumbents were returned by acclamation. Four other high-profile incumbents were not running for re-election, including Premier Joe Handley representing Weledeh, cabinet minister and dean of the legislature Charles Dent representing Frame Lake, cabinet minister Brenden Bell and private member Bill Braden (brother of former Premier George Braden).

Premier retires
Joe Handley the 10th Premier of the Northwest Territories, announced his retirement.

Rehab
Former candidate Peter Liske withdrew his candidacy shortly before the nomination deadline closed in Weledeh. Liske's campaign came under scrutiny after he promised to enter rehab for alcohol abuse if he was elected. His campaign promise acquired international attention after the story was picked up by The Tonight Show as part of the Headlines segment. The original news story Dettah chief candidates debate issues featured in the Headlines segment was published by the Northern News Service on August 6, 2007.

Criminal records
Four candidates who ran in 2007 have criminal records. Henry Zoe, former MLA for North Slave, was twice convicted for spousal assault and resisting arrest. He resigned his seat over the latter charge in 2004. Hay River South candidate Greg McMeekin was convicted of assault, resisting arrest and making death threats; a warrant was out for his arrest for violating probation. Nahendeh candidate Arnold Hope was convicted for drug possession in 2006 and unsafe storage of a firearm. Marc Bogan was convicted of the misdemeanor charge of mischief for releasing live crickets all over the Yellowknife Courthouse in 2005.

Conflict of interest
In the electoral district of Tu Nedhe, incumbent Bobby J. Villeneuve finished a distant fourth in a field of six candidates. He was disciplined by the Conflict of Interest commissioner in June 2007 after swearing a legal oath that he lived in Fort Resolution, Northwest Territories, which allowed him access to a CA$25,000 a year living allowance for living accommodations in Yellowknife. The estimated cost to tax payers was $65,000. He was forced to reimburse $10,000.

Disqualification
A complaint was filed to the Chief Returning Officer Saundra Arberry over the disqualification of Tu Nedhe candidate Noeline Villebrun. The former candidate sent her nomination paperwork and endorsement signatures by facsimile from British Columbia, a half-hour before the nomination deadline on September 7, 2007. The returning officer from Elections NWT disqualified the paperwork on the grounds that the paperwork was not in the original ink. Villebrun's official agent filed a complaint on the basis that submitting paper work by fax is not forbidden under the Elections Act. Arberry upheld the decision of the Returning Officer and advised the Villebrun campaign to seek legal counsel. Villebrun was attempting her second run at office, she last ran as a candidate in the 1999 Northwest Territories general election in the same electoral district.

NWT Party
In past elections, political parties have appeared claiming to run slates of candidates. Yellowknife Centre candidate Bryan Sutherland claimed to lead the NWT Party, and was the only candidate in this election representing the party in its slate. Sutherland said that whether or not he was elected he would push for the party to be formally registered. The Northwest Territories has no laws recognizing or validating any political parties operating on the territorial level. Sutherland was defeated, finishing a distant fourth in his district.

New Premier selected
On October 17, 2007 Inuvik Boot Lake MLA Floyd Roland was elected as the eleventh Premier of the territory by the Legislative Assembly. He ran for Premier against Thebacha MLA Michael Miltenberger. After being elected Premier, Roland promised to push the Government of Canada to give the Northwest Territories provincial powers enjoyed by other jurisdictions.

Election summary

District and candidate results

Notes:
Candidates in bold denotes incumbents.
With the exception of Michael McLeod, Floyd Roland and Norman Yakeleya, who were all acclaimed, the results are currently unofficial.

References

External links
Elections NWT
Election Almanac - Northwest Territories Territorial Election

2007 elections in Canada
Elections in the Northwest Territories
October 2007 events in Canada
2007 in the Northwest Territories